(born 29 November 1971) is a Japanese actress based in the United Kingdom. She is known for her roles as Toshiko Sato in Doctor Who and Torchwood, Yasuko Namba in Everest, Sarah in Absolutely Fabulous and Nicola in Spice World.

Early life
Naoko Mori was born on 29 November 1971 in Nagoya, Japan, to a Ryukyuan mother and a Japanese American father. When Mori was four years old, she moved to New Jersey due to her father's work. She returned to Japan when she was ten and moved to London two years later. When her parents were posted back to Japan, Mori was given the choice of either moving back to Japan with her parents or remaining in London on her own. She chose to stay in London, partly because she wanted to finish her GCSEs and gain some qualifications. She attended the Royal Russell School. Mori's father opened a bank account for her, handed her a cheque book and told her to find a flat or a bed sit for herself to live in. Mori said that being on her own at such a young age helped her to be a very independent person, although it was still a scary world to be faced so young.

Acting career

While studying for her A-levels, she auditioned and joined London's West End production of the Vietnam War musical Miss Saigon. She later went on to play Kim and became the first Japanese national to play a lead role in the West End. From 1993 to 1994, Mori had a regular role on the hospital drama Casualty as the hospital receptionist Mie Nishikawa. Film roles followed, including appearances in the 1997 musical comedy film Spice World and Topsy-Turvy (1999). Mori also appeared in the television programmes Thief Takers (1997), Judge John Deed (2001), Spooks (2002), Mile High (2003) and Powers (2004). In 1995, she had a small role as a Japanese computer hacker in the film Hackers. Mori had a major role in the 2005 BBC docu-drama Hiroshima, which contained dramatic re-enactments of the 1945 atomic bombing. Mori also provided the voice acting for the villainess Mai Hem for the game Perfect Dark Zero.

In 2005, Mori had a small role as Dr. Sato in the Doctor Who episode "Aliens of London". Producer Russell T Davies took note of her performance and decided to bring the character back as a regular in the first two series of the Doctor Who spin-off Torchwood. Mori's Torchwood character, Toshiko Sato, was killed in "Exit Wounds", the final episode of Torchwood'''s second series, but has not ruled out the possibility of returning to the show at a later date. Since her exit from the show, Mori has reprised the character in multiple Torchwood audio dramas by Big Finish Productions, some of them with her as a lead with a guest cast, but some with her as part of the team with the rest of the main Torchwood cast. She returned to the West End on 20 November 2006, when she took over the role of Christmas Eve from Ann Harada in the London production of Avenue Q, a role which she played until 14 April 2007.
Mori portrayed Yoko Ono in the BBC Four production Lennon Naked, which was broadcast in the UK on 23 Wednesday June 2010. The film reunited her with Christopher Eccleston, who played John Lennon, opposite whom she played Dr. Sato in her Doctor Who appearance. Before joining Torchwood, Mori acted as Kim in Miss Saigon alongside future co-star John Barrowman as Chris.

Mori appeared in the movie Everest (2015), as Yasuko Namba, opposite Jason Clarke, Josh Brolin, John Hawkes, Jake Gyllenhaal, Robin Wright, Keira Knightley, and Sam Worthington. In 2018 Mori played Lady Thiang in The King and I'' in London.

She was also the voice of Nagisa Kisaragi in the 2018 version of Gerry Anderson's Firestorm.

Personal life
Mori is a Japanese Buddhist. She has an elder brother with whom she grew up in New Jersey. At the age of 16 or 17 she moved into a flat on her own in London. This was when her career expanded. She wanted to become a singer before she was an actress.

Filmography

Film

Television

Video games

References

External links

 
 
 Digital Spy interview with Naoko Mori, 4 Apr 2008

Living people
People from Nagoya
Japanese Buddhists
Japanese film actresses
Japanese expatriates in the United Kingdom
Japanese television actresses
Japanese video game actresses
Japanese voice actresses
20th-century Japanese actresses
21st-century Japanese actresses
People educated at Royal Russell School
1971 births